Peter Wilson (born 9 August 1942) is a British field hockey player. He competed in the men's tournament at the 1968 Summer Olympics.

While studying at St Edmund Hall at the University of Oxford, Wilson played two first-class cricket matches for Oxford University in 1964, against Hampshire and Derbyshire at Oxford. He scored 56 runs in his two matches, with a high score of 30.

References

External links
 

1942 births
Living people
Alumni of St Edmund Hall, Oxford
English cricketers
Oxford University cricketers
British male field hockey players
Olympic field hockey players of Great Britain
Field hockey players at the 1968 Summer Olympics
People from Weston-super-Mare